Yevgeni Aleksandrovich Chabanov (born 8 August 1997) is a Russian football player.

Club career
He made his debut in the Russian Professional Football League for FC Rotor Volgograd on 28 July 2016 in a game against FC Mashuk-KMV Pyatigorsk.

He made his Russian Football National League debut for Rotor on 2 September 2017 in a game against FC Yenisey Krasnoyarsk.

He made his Russian Premier League debut for FC Tambov on 26 February 2021 in a game against FC Rotor Volgograd. He substituted Nikita Drozdov in the 69th minute of a 1–3 home loss.

References

External links
 
 Profile by Russian Professional Football League

1997 births
People from Komsomolsk-on-Amur
Sportspeople from Khabarovsk Krai
Living people
Russian footballers
Association football midfielders
Association football forwards
FC Rotor Volgograd players
FC Chernomorets Novorossiysk players
FC Urozhay Krasnodar players
FC Tambov players
FC Amkar Perm players
FC Mashuk-KMV Pyatigorsk players
Russian Premier League players
Russian First League players
Russian Second League players